DAAA may refer to:

 Dominica Amateur Athletic Association
 Dwarf Athletic Association of America